is a city in Gunma Prefecture, Japan. Shibukawa is the location of Ikaho Onsen, a popular hot spring resort.

Geography
Shibukawa is in the northern extremity of the Kantō plains of central Gunma Prefecture, encompassing the juncture of the Tone River and Agatsuma River. To the west is Mount Haruna, and to the east is Mount Akagi. To the north are Mount Onoko and Mount Komochi. The Tone River flows from the north (between Mount Akagi and Mount Komochi) southward through the city, while the Agatsuma River flows from the west (between Mount Onoko and Mount Haruna), merging with the Tone River near the center of the city.

Farmland covers  (20.8% of the city), housing covers  (8.4%), and mountains and forests cover  (32.2%). The remaining  (38.6%) has other land uses.

Surrounding municipalities
To the north: Numata, Shōwa, Takayama
To the east: Maebashi
To the south: Maebashi, Shintō, Yoshioka
To the west: Takasaki, Higashiagatsuma, Nakanojō

Climate
Shibukawa has a Humid continental climate (Köppen Cfa) characterized by warm summers and cold winters with heavy snowfall.  The average annual temperature in Shibukawa is 13.7 °C. The average annual rainfall is 1335 mm with September as the wettest month. The temperatures are highest on average in August, at around 26.1 °C, and lowest in January, at around 2.3 °C.

Demographics
Per Japanese census data, the population of Shibukawa peaked around the year 1990 and has declined since.

History
Shibukawa is located within traditional Kōzuke Province. During the Edo period, the area of present-day Shibukawa prospered from its location on the Mikuni Kaidō highway connecting Takasaki with Niigata. Post stations within the borders of modern Shibukawa were Shibukawa-shuku, Kanai-shuku, Kitamoku-shuku and Yokobori-shuku.

Shibukawa town was created in Nishigunma District, Gunma Prefecture on April 1, 1889 with the creation of the modern municipalities system after the Meiji Restoration. In 1896, Nishiguma District and Kataoka District merged to form Gunma District, Gunma; however, the area containing Shibukawa was separated out in October 1949 into Kitagunma District. On April 1, 1954, Shibukawa absorbed the villages of Furumaki, Kanashima and Toyoaki to become the city of Shibukawa.

On February 20, 2006, Shibukawa absorbed the town of Ikaho, the villages of Komochi and Onogami (all from Kitagunma District), and the villages of Akagi and Kitatachibana (both from Seta District).

Government
Shibukawa has a mayor-council form of government with a directly elected mayor and a unicameral city council of 18 members. Shibukawa contributes two members to the Gunma Prefectural Assembly. In terms of national politics, the city is divided between the Gunma 1st district and the Gunma 5th district of the lower house of the Diet of Japan.

Economy
Shibukawa is a regional commercial center and transportation hub. Seasonal tourism, particularly to its hot spring and ski resorts, play a major role in the local economy.

The area is noted for its production of konjac.

Education
Shibukawa has 14 public elementary schools and nine public middle schools operated by the city government, and four public high schools operated by the Gunma Prefectural Board of Education. The prefecture also operates two special education schools for the handicapped.

High schools
Shibukawa High School
Shibukawa Girls' High School
Shibukawa Kougyou High School
Shibukawa Seisui High School

Middle schools
Akagi North Middle School
Akagi South Middle School
Furumaki Middle School
Hokkitsu Middle School
Ikaho Middle School
Kanashima Middle School
Komochi Middle School
Shibukawa Middle School
Shibukawa North Middle School

Elementary schools
Ikaho Elementary School
Furumaki Elementary School
Kanashima Elementary School
Miharada Elementary School
Nagaou Elementary School
Nakagou Elementary School
Onogami Elementary School
Shibukawa North Elementary School
Shibukawa South Elementary School
Shibukawa West Elementary School
Tachibana North Elementary School
Tachibana South Elementary School
Toyoaki Elementary School
Tsukuda Elementary School

Transportation

Railway
 JR East – Jōetsu Line
 -  -  - 
 JR East – Agatsuma Line
  -  -  -  – 
Ikaho Ropeway 
Hototogisu Station and Miharashi Station

Highway
  – Shibukawa-Ikaho IC, Akagi IC

Local attractions
Ikaho Onsen
Takehisa Yumeji Memorial Museum
Tokutomi Roka Memorial Museum
Mizusawa-dera, 16th stop on the Bandō Sanjūsankasho pilgrimage
Shibukawa Skyland Park - an amusement park
Ikaho Green Bokujou - a farm designed to show its visitors about farming
Ikaho Sistina Museum- an op art museum which also has a Sistine Chapel replica
Japan Chanson Museum - a museum dedicated to the chanson style of music
Shibukawa Sōgō Park - a large park encompassing hiking trails, campsites, tennis courts, a baseball diamond, a running track, and other recreational facilities
Onoike Ajisai Park- a hydrangea park with a pond and hiking trails
Shibukawa Sky Terume - a hot spring in a building which looks something like a spaceship

Festivals
Shibukawa calls itself "The Bellybutton of Japan" (日本のおへそ) and hosts the Bellybutton Festival (へそ祭り) every year in late July. The festival is based on a traditional Japanese form of entertainment where revelers paint a face on their torsos and stomachs and pretend it is a head. A kimono is then wrapped around the waist and the person's real head is hidden by a large cloth hat. The belly button is traditionally painted into a mouth. These days, modern motifs and Japanese anime designs have crept into the festival, which city officials said is all about having fun.

Sister city relations
Shibukawa is twinned with:
 - Abano Terme, Veneto, Italy, since March 23, 1993
, Whakatane, New Zealand, since 1992
 - Logan City, Queensland, Australia, friendship city since April 17, 1996 
 – Hawaii County, Hawaii, United States, since January 22, 1997  
 - Foligno, Umbria, Italy, since March 23, 2000

Noted people from Shibukawa
Chūsei Sone, movie director
Jiro Sato, tennis player
Chocoball Mukai, actor
Kiyohiko Shibukawa, fashion model, actor
Takahiro Fujioka, baseball player
Keisuke Kanoh, baseball player

References

External links

Official Website 
Shibukawa Ikaho Spa and Resort Tourism Association

Cities in Gunma Prefecture
Shibukawa, Gunma